Erskine is a Scottish surname. The name is derived from a habitational name from a location (Erskine) on the southern bank of the River Clyde, near Glasgow. This place was first recorded in 1225 as Erskin. Early spellings of the place include: Yrskin (1227); Ireskin (1262); Harskin (1300), and Irschen (1300). The Scottish Gaelic form of the surname is Arascain. Legend dictates that the name was given by King Malcolm II to a man who killed the Danish General Enrique at the Battle of Murthill. He is said to have shown the bloody knife to king and said eris-skyne, meaning "upon the knife". The King, in honour of his valour, granted him the surname Eriskine.

List of people with the surname
Albert Russel Erskine (1871–1933), an American businessman who served as president of the Studebaker Corporation from 1915 to 1933
Carl Erskine (born 1926), former Major League Baseball pitcher who played for the Brooklyn and Los Angeles Dodgers from 1948 to 1959
Chris Erskine (born 1987), Scottish footballer
David Erskine, (1776–1855), British diplomat and politician
Ebenezer Erskine (1680–1754), Scottish minister whose actions led to the establishment of the Secession Church
Emmanuel Erskine (1937–2021), Ghanaian army general and former commander of the United Nations Interim Force in Lebanon and the United Nations Truce Supervision Organization
 George Erskine (1899–1965), British general who commanded the 7th Armoured Division during World War II,
Gizzi Erskine (born 1979), British chef and TV personality
Graves B. Erskine (1897–1973), U.S. Marine Corps general who led the 3rd Marine Division during the World War II Battle of Iwo Jima
Henry Erskine (lawyer) (1746–1817), Scottish Whig politician and lawyer
Jacob Erskine (born 1989), English footballer
Joe Erskine (American boxer) (1930–2009), former welterweight boxer and long distance runner
Joe Erskine (Welsh boxer) (1934–1990), former British and British Empire heavyweight boxing champion
John Erskine (disambiguation), several people
Kenneth Erskine (born 1963), British serial killer known as the "Stockwell Strangler" who murdered seven elderly people in and around London during a three-month period in 1986
Laurie York Erskine (1894–1976), American author and educator
Margaret Erskine (disambiguation), several people
Maya Erskine (born 1987), American actress and writer
Peter Erskine (born 1954), American jazz drummer and composer 
Ralph Erskine (preacher) (1685–1752), Scottish churchman
Ralph Erskine (architect) (1914–2005), London-born architect who lived and worked in Sweden for most of his life
Robert Erskine (1735–1780), map-maker to George Washington during the American Revolutionary War
Scott Erskine (1962–2020), American serial killer sentenced to death for the murder of two California boys in 1993
Thomas Erskine (theologian) (1788–1870)
Thomas Erskine, 1st Baron Erskine (1750–1823), British lawyer and politician
William Erskine (disambiguation), several people

See also
Earl of Mar
Earl of Kellie
Lord Erskine
Erskine Baronets
Clan Erskine

References

Scottish toponymic surnames
Scottish Gaelic-language surnames
Surnames of Lowland Scottish origin